Hypoabelian group or Hypoabelian may refer to:

"Hypoabelian group", an archaic name for an orthogonal group over a field of characteristic 2
A hypoabelian  group, a group whose perfect core is trivial